Shimono (written: 下野 or 下農) is a Japanese surname. Notable people with the surname include:

, Japanese footballer
, Japanese badminton player
, Japanese voice actor and singer
Sab Shimono (born 1937), American actor

See also
Shimono-shima, the southern end of Tsushima Island, Nagasaki Prefecture, Japan

Japanese-language surnames